Corophium is a genus of the amphipod family Corophiidae. Formerly a much larger genus, many species have been transferred to segregate genera such as Monocorophium and Crassicorophium.

Species
Corophium contains 12 species, after the genus was divided into a number of new genera in 1997:
Corophium arenarium Crawford, 1937
Corophium bicaudatus Linnaeus, 1761
Corophium colo Lowry, 2004
Corophium denticulatum Ren, 1995
Corophium grossipes Linnaeus, 1767
Corophium laevicorne Sowinsky, 1880
Corophium linearis Pennant, 1777
Corophium longicornis J. C. Fabricius, 1779
Corophium multisetosum Stock, 1952
Corophium orientale Schellenberg, 1928
Corophium urdaibaiense Marquiegui & Perez, 2006
Corophium volutator (Pallas, 1766)

Corophium arenarium
C. arenarium may reach 7 mm long and looks very similar to C. volutator. It burrows in bottom sediments, between 10 and 60 metres deep. C. arenarium occurs on the coasts of France and the North Sea.

Corophium multisetosum
C. multisetosum may grow to 9 mm and builds mud burrows in clay or sand in fresh or weakly brackish habitats. It occurs on the coasts of the Netherlands, France, Germany, Poland and the British Isles.

Corophium volutator

C. volutator inhabits the upper layers of sand on the coasts of the Netherlands, Germany, the United Kingdom and France, as well as in the Bay of Fundy, New Brunswick, Canada. They grow to 10 mm, and can occur in huge quantities: up to 40,000 per square metre have been observed.

References

Corophiidea